{{Infobox animanga/Other
|title      = Related
|content     =
 Pokémon Adventures (1997–present)
}}Pokémon Black and White is a manga series based on the Pokémon video games of the same name, and the tenth chapter of the series Pokémon Adventures. They follow the adventures of Black and his journey through the Unova region. 20 mini-volumes in total were released between 2011 and 2015. The manga are written by Hidenori Kusaka with art by Satoshi Yamamoto and were released by Viz Media and VizKids in the United States. The series is a special edition of the Pokémon Adventures. Before the series was fully collected in tankoban volumes, mini-volumes collected directly from the magazine versions were released internationally. The series was eventually collected in Tankoban volumes under the name Pokemon Adventures: Black and White. 9 volumes were released between 2013 and 2015.

Promotion
To promote Pokémon Black and White, during the theatrical premiere of Pokémon the Movie:White—Victini and Zekrom on December 3 and December 4, 2011, a free bonus manga sample containing part of chapter two in the first volume was given out.

 Plot 
Black is a hot-headed boy whose dream is to win the Pokémon League. He owns a Munna and a Braviary, which he nicknamed after their evolved forms, Musha (after Musharna) and Brav (Braviary). Black's dream takes up so much of his mind that overthinking would cause him to faint, so he uses Musha to eat up his dream in order to give him more space to think. Proffesor Juniper delivers a package containing 3 Pokémon (the Unova starters Tepig, Snivy, and Oshawatt) and 3 Pokédexes to be given to Black and his childhood friends, Cheren and Bianca. A mishap causes the Tepig to run away (with Black chasing after it) and the other 2 Pokédexes to become damaged. Black befriends the Tepig, calling it Tep, and sets out on his journey.

During the production of a commercial in Route 1, Black arrives to announce his dream, accidentally getting roped into show business by White. White and her Tepig Gigi work for the BW Agency, who book Pokémon for roles in movies and TV shows. Black gets blamed for a Galvantua attacking the set (which Black catches and names Tula), and has to pay for the damages by working for the BW Agency. In Accumula Town, Black and White see a speech by Team Plasma from Ghetsis, who urges people to liberate their Pokémon by releasing them, regardless of their connection to their trainers. Black opposes this and tries to chase Team Plasma down, but is stopped by N, a mysterious trainer who emphasizes the importance of listening to Pokémon. N challenges Black to a battle, opposing the use of Pokéballs and the Pokédex. Black loses, but the courage of his Tepig in battle shocks N, lamenting the idea that Pokémon want to be with humans.

Black and White continue their journey through the Unova region. Black meets up with Cheren and Bianca in Striaton City and team up to defeat the city's Gym Leader, White proposes the idea of a Pokémon Musical to debut in Nimbasa City, and Black faces off against Team Plasma several times; Once in Route 3, when a group of Team Plasma grunts kidnap Musha, in Nacrene City, where Team Plasma attempts to steal a fossil from the Nacrene City Museum, in Castelia City, where Black finds a stronghold where "liberated" Pokémon are being kept, and in Liberty Garden, where Team Plasma is trying to capture Mythical Pokémon Victini. The Pokémon Musical in Nimbasa City goes off with little issues, but right after White is kidnapped by N and trapped on a Ferris wheel. Black's Tepig also evolves (to White's frustration) and is renamed Nite after Pignite. While Black fights gym leader Elesa, N reveals to White that he is Team Plasma's King, given a responsibility by Ghetsis to save Pokémon from trainers. N manages to talk Gigi into leaving White by showing its ability to fight, and White, unable to accept that revelation, jumps out the Ferris wheel, with N's Servine following her. Although traumatized, White decides to temporarily suspend her business and take up Pokémon battling, deciding to train and build a team on the Battle Subway in Nimbasa City.

While White trains in the Battle Subway, Black continues on his journey to win the Pokémon League. He defeats a Zorua that was causing troubles with the drawbridge connecting Nimbasa and Driftveil City, and he teams up with Cheren to fight Team Plasma members in the Cold Storage in Driftveil City. Black also defeats the Driftveil City Gym Leader, Clay. Clay reveals that Team Plasma is planning to invade the Nacrene City Museum to obtain the Dark Stone, which contains the Legendary Pokémon Zekrom, who represents the extreme ideals of Team Plasma. Black defeats Gym Leader Skyla as proof he can face Team Plasma, and the Gym Leaders and Black travel to the Nacrene Museum to battle Team Plasma. While the Gym leaders fight Team Plasma, Black goes inside the Museum to find the Dark Stone. However, the Gym Leaders (except Brycen and Drayden) are defeated and kidnapped, and a Team Plasma grunt disguised as Elite Four member Brycen takes the Dark Stone and delivers it to Ghetsis, who uses N to reawaken Zekrom. Black learns that he must reawaken Reshiram, the Pokémon of Truth, from the Light Stone and use it to defeat Team Plasma, training at the Tubeline bridge. Blacks Pignite evolves again and is renamed Bo, after its final evolution Emboar. Black defeats Gym Leader Brycen, but panics after learning that the Pokémon League was set to happen one week later instead of three months later, deciding not the obtain the final Gym Badge. Meanwhile, White, now with a full team of Pokémon, helps Bianca discover what to do with her life, as she feels that she hasn't gotten better as a Trainer, and in gratitude, gifts her Pokédex to White.

Black and White reunite, but learn that N has defeated Alder, the Unova League Champion, as part of a plan to prove himself as the superior trainer and convince everyone to liberate their own Pokémon. N tries to reason with Black, White, and Professor Juniper, saying that the professors had been mistreating their Pokémon and that he wanted to liberate them as part of Team Plasma's goal. Black tries to battle N to get information on where Team Plasma's headquarters are, but his Pokémon decide not to fight N. Black tries to get Musha's help, but Musha flies off, which N claims is because it doesn't want to eat his dream, which has been warped from the stress of having to defeat Team Plasma and his insecurities of not being able to reach the Pokémon League in time. Black faints from the shock of hearing this, and N flies off.

The day of the Pokémon League arrives, and Black wakes up to discover that the opening ceremony is already underway. Black considers leaving for home, but regains some of his confidence when realizing he would be disappointing his Pokémon. Black challenges Drayden to a last minute battle to obtain the final Gym Badge, and a message from the Gym Leaders fully reignites his confidence, allowing him to defeat Drayden and enter the Pokémon league as the 32nd contestant. The final 8 contestants are Black, Iris, Cheren, Marlon, Leo, Gray (A Team Plasma Sage in disguise), Looker (disguised as Lou Karr to investigate Team Plasma), and Hood Man (later revealed to be Colress, the antagonist of the Black 2/White 2 arc). White attempts to investigate Hood Man while the Pokémon League is happening. In the finals, Black faces Cheren, who was manipulated by Team Plasma after their encounter at the Cold Storage, and is convinced that he can win the battle with raw strength. White manages to uncover Gray's real identity and tells Black that Team Plasma has invaded the Pokémon League, but she is teleported away. Black defeats Cheren thanks to the help of Musha (who has finally evolved), and his anger at Team Plasma for manipulating his friend reawakens Reshiram from the Light Stone.

The awakening of Reshiram prompts Team Plasma to unleash their final part of their plan, revealing a castle that was underneath the Pokémon League stadium, with N flying on his Zekrom. While the gym leaders, Elite Four, various trainers Black and White met on their journey, and Black's Pokémon fight the Seven Sages, Black flies on Reshiram and faces N. Black understanding Reshiram's abilities using the Pokédex, something that is opposed by Team Plasma's ideals, allows him to "hear" Reshiram's voice, something that surprises N. while Black fights N inside the castle, White wakes up in N's playroom. There, N's caretakers explain that N was orphaned and always had the ability to hear Pokémon, something that Ghetsis used to his advantage in crafting Team Plasma. N has also released all of his Pokémon, including Gigi, where it reunites with White. Black defeats N, and the sudden appearance of N's Zorua makes him realize that Pokémon want to be with their trainers. Ghetsis appears just as things seem to calm down, revealing that he is N's adoptive father, as well as his true intentions; Take over the world and manipulate people to give up their Pokémon, making Ghetsis the only one to use them. Ghetsis fights Black's Pokémon all at once, but Black defeats Ghetsis using Musha. Black and White reunite once more after the battle is over. N regains consciousness and flies off with his Zekrom, wondering what's next for him. Reshiram starts turning back into the Light Stone, and Ghetsis manages to force Black in. The Light Stone flies off as White watches. A Team Plasma member befriends a Foongus as they leave Team Plasma's castle alongside other members.

Volume listNote: Viz's official English-translated titles through the first nine volumes.

References

Black And White
Viz Media manga